Zhyngyldy (Jyngyldy, جىنگىلدى), also known as Zhyngghyldy or Kuybyshevo (Kuybyshevo), is a town in Mangystau Region, southwest Kazakhstan.

References

Mangystau Region
Cities and towns in Kazakhstan